Salten is a traditional district in Nordland county, Norway. It includes the municipalities of Meløy, Gildeskål, Bodø, Beiarn, Saltdal, Fauske, Sørfold, Steigen, and Hamarøy.

The district borders Helgeland in the south (see Saltfjellet), Ofoten in the north, Sweden in the east, and Vestfjorden (and Lofoten) in the west. The geology in Salten is known in Norway for having the country's largest areas with marble. There are many fjords, and mountains often reaching to the sea. The town of Bodø is the main population center of the district, while the town of Fauske is a secondary center.

Media gallery

Dialect
The dialect of Salten is well known for its large use of apocope. For instance, a local would say  while in the formal Norwegian language one would say   The words in this list are pronounced with two syllables in formal Norwegian, but with just one in some Salten dialects.

Name
The district is named after the Saltfjorden (Old Norse: Salpti), and the fjord is probably named after the famous Saltstraumen. Even though the word salt has the same meaning in the modern Norwegian language as in the English language, these names most likely have nothing to do with salt, but are derived from an old (obsolete) word  with the meaning "strong stream".

Three other fjords in Norway with narrow entrances (and thus strong tidal streams) also have names including -salten: Busalten in Fosnes, and Nordsalten and Sørsalten in Nærøy.

References

Districts of Nordland
Meløy
Gildeskål
Bodø
Beiarn
Saltdal
Fauske
Sørfold
Steigen
Hamarøy